Mikhail Aleksandrovich Rudkovskiy (born 1 February 1979) is a former Russian professional football player.

Club career
He played in the Russian Football National League for FC Avangard Kursk in 2005.

External links
 

1979 births
Living people
Russian footballers
FC Spartak Tambov players
FC Taganrog players
Association football midfielders
FC Rostov players
FC Avangard Kursk players
FC Lokomotiv Kaluga players